"Insomnia" is a song by American singer Daya, released as a single on March 8, 2019, through Interscope Records. The song was produced by Oscar Görres, and its music video was released on March 26, 2019. It peaked in top 15 in Czech Republic and Norway.

Background
Daya described the song as a "gritty club pop anthem about missing the person you love". She told Billboard that the song is partially about having "serious sleep issues from touring and everything". Along with its meaning of having a "new love interest", the song's "trance music roots are intended to simulate an all-night party and give the song a third meaning", with Daya saying she also wanted to take the song in a "rave direction".

Critical reception
Billboard said the track had "shuddering pop production" and an "oscillating beat", while Idolator called it "one of the best pop songs of 2019" as well as "ruthless catchy and endlessly danceable". Paper described the song as a "nervy, heart-racing bop with a jittery beat (a little reminiscent of "Disturbia") about being unable to sleep without an absent lover".

Music video
The music video was directed by Nick Harwood and released on March 26, 2019. It features Daya sitting on her own in a room of a warehouse while others dance in a different room. Daya is later shown singing in front of the dancing crowd.

Track listings

Charts

Release history

References

Songs about sleep
2019 singles
2019 songs
Daya (singer) songs
Songs written by Michael Pollack (musician)
Songs written by Oscar Görres
Songs written by Jacob Kasher
Songs written by Daya (singer)